Kathryn Anne "Kathy" Whaler OBE FRSE FAGU (born 11 June 1956) is a professor of geophysics at the University of Edinburgh School of GeoSciences, in the Research Institute of Earth and Planetary Science and is a member of the Solid Earth Geophysics and Natural Hazards Research Group.

Early life and Education
Born in Salisbury, Whaler attended Croydon High School for Girls (with a year at Old Kampala Senior Secondary School).  She attended the University of Sussex between 1974 and 1977, graduating with BSc (1st Class Honours) in Mathematical-Physics.  Her PhD thesis (1981), completed at the University of Cambridge, was entitled Some applications of inverse theory to geomagnetism.

Early research
Whaler stayed at Cambridge in a post-Doctoral role for two years before joining the University of Leeds in 1983 as a lecturer. In 1994, she moved to the University of Edinburgh to take up the Chair of Geophysics.

She was the President of the Royal Astronomical Society, the main Learned Society for solid Earth geophysics in the UK, from 2004 to 2006.

Whaler became President of the International Association of Geomagnetism and Aeronomy (IAGA) at the 25th IUGG General Assembly in Melbourne, 2011, after four years as Vice-President (2007–11), and Executive Committee member (2003-7). Whaler was elected IUGG Vice President at the 26th IUGG General Assembly in Prague, 2015, and was elected President in 2019.

She has undertaken a number of sabbaticals which have given her experience of NASA’s Goddard Space Flight Center, Harvard University, the University of California at San Diego (where she was a Green Scholar), Victoria University of Wellington, and Göttingen University (as Gauss Professor), funded by the Fulbright Foundation, NASA, the Cecil H and Ida M Green Foundation, and Göttingen Academy of Sciences.

Recent Research

GEOSPACE
Whaler led a NERC funded consortium looking at Geomagnetic Earth Observation from SPACE. This was a 5 year research grant funding the exploitation of data from the new generation of vector magnetic field satellites.

Crustal Magnetisation
This research uses satellite data to infer crustal magnetisation of the Earth (part of GEOSPACE), Mars and the Moon. Much of this research is in collaboration with Mike Purucker at NASA's Goddard Space Flight Center.

Magnetotellurics
This involves field-based projects in Africa, aimed at structural and tectonic understanding, and assessing hydrocarbon potential. Part of the Afar rift consortium, this is an inter-disciplinary study of how the Earth’s crust grows at divergent plate boundaries. It is within this field that she, in collaboration with Derek Keir, published her highest cited paper during the 2008-2013 time window relevant for inclusion in the Research Excellence Framework.

Interviews
Whaler was interviewed for the Royal Society of Edinburgh's 14th edition of Science Scotland and this was reported in an article entitled "Magnetic Field Personality". The article spans across the full range of her research, even going back several decades.

In September 2013 she was interviewed by Becky Oskin from LiveScience.com in "Giant Underground Blob of Magma Puzzles Scientists"., for her contribution to an article in Nature Geoscience: "A mantle magma reservoir beneath an incipient mid-ocean ridge in Afar, Ethiopia".  This type of science - magnetotellurics - researched by Whaler is characterised by its imaging aspect; naturally occurring electric and magnetic fields are measured, and so don't need a potentially dangerous source, but a small amount of digging to install the sensors. The distribution of electrical conductivity is interpreted from the data.

Awards and recognition
Whaler gave the Bullard Lecture of the American Geophysical Union in San Francisco in December 2012 on studies in East Africa.

Whaler’s contributions have been recognised through Fellowship of the American Geophysical Union, the Institute of Physics, and the Royal Society of Edinburgh, invitations to give the Bullerwell Lecture and the Gunning Victoria Jubilee Prize
Lecture, and the naming of a minor planet(asteroid)(5914 Kathywhaler) after her.

Whaler was awarded the Royal Astronomical Society Price Medal in 2013.   The Price Medal is awarded for investigations of outstanding merit in solid earth geophysics, oceanography or planetary sciences.

Whaler was the recipient of the Gunning Victoria Jubilee Prize Lectureship 29th Award in 1996.

Whaler received an OBE for services to Geophysics in 2018.

In 2020, Whaler received the Clough Medal from the Edinburgh Geological Society.
In 2023, Whaler was announced as the Wollaston Medal awardee; the premier medal of the Geological Society of London.

References

1956 births
Academics of the University of Edinburgh
British geophysicists
Women geophysicists
Living people
Fellows of the American Geophysical Union
Presidents of the Royal Astronomical Society
Presidents of the International Union of Geodesy and Geophysics
Officers of the Order of the British Empire
Wollaston Medal winners